Ephebopus rufescens, known as the red skeleton tarantula, is a species of tarantula (family Theraphosidae). It is found in French Guiana and Brazil.

References 

Theraphosidae
Spiders described in 2000
Spiders of South America
Taxa named by Rick C. West